Chatham Waterfront bus station serves the area of Medway, South East England. The bus station opened in October 2011, replacing the town's previous Pentagon bus station which was built in the 1970s and was considered an unwelcoming environment for passengers.

The bus station is part of the town's regeneration scheme. Medway Council demolished the John Hawkins flyover in Chatham town centre to make room for the bus station.

The main operators at the bus station are Arriva Southern Counties and Nu-Venture.

The bus station has 19 stands on four platforms. Bus services run from the bus station around the Medway area and to parts of Kent. The bus station has a travel centre and public toilets.

The bus station has been criticised for its open design and waterfront location as compared to the previous enclosed Pentagon bus station.

Incidents
In May 2014, a bus driver collapsed at the wheel in to a traffic island on the junction of Railway Street near the station. The driver was taken to Medway Maritime Hospital.

In April 2014, a bus had crashed in to a grass verge of The Paddock. Two passengers were taken to Medway Maritime Hospital.

References

External links

 Chatham Waterfront FAQ's - Archive
 Chatham Waterfront bus station to 'transform transport' - BBC News Kent - 11 September 2011

Bus stations in England
Transport in Medway